Pristella crinogi is a freshwater fish in the family Characidae of the order Characiformes. It is a tropical fish. It resides in the basins of the Tocantins River and São Francisco River.

References

Fish described in 2021
Freshwater fish of South America
Characidae